Richard John Karlis (born May 23, 1959) is a former American football placekicker who played nine seasons for the Denver Broncos, Minnesota Vikings, and Detroit Lions in the National Football League from 1982 to 1990. He played college football at the University of Cincinnati and is known as the last of the field goal kickers who kicked barefoot full-time in the NFL.

Karlis is best known for kicking the game-winning field goal in overtime for Denver against the Cleveland Browns in the 1986 AFC Championship Game to reach Super Bowl XXI. He had an uneven performance in Super Bowl XXI, tying a Super Bowl record with a 48-yard field goal, while missing a 23-yard attempt, the shortest missed field goal in Super Bowl history at that time.

In 1989, as a member of the Vikings, he tied a then NFL record by kicking seven field goals in a 23–21 win against the Los Angeles Rams, a record which stood until 2007 when Rob Bironas of the Tennessee Titans broke the record with eight field goals in a game against the Houston Texans.

Karlis made 172 field goals and 283 extra point attempts for 799 points in his career and also holds Super Bowl records for most field goal attempts with six, making three of them and other records including most consecutive field goals made as a rookie with thirteen in 1982.

Karlis is the creator of an instructional video for kickers.

References

External links
 

1959 births
Living people
American football placekickers
Cincinnati Bearcats football players
Denver Broncos players
Detroit Lions players
Minnesota Vikings players
People from Salem, Ohio
Players of American football from Ohio